Mani Ratnam is an Indian filmmaker who works predominantly in Tamil cinema. Regarded as one of the greatest Indian filmmakers, he is credited with redefining the "range and depth of Tamil cinema". As of 2019, he has directed 28 films, and produced over 15 under his production company Madras Talkies.

Mani Ratnam made his directorial debut, without formal training or education in filmmaking, with the Kannada film Pallavi Anu Pallavi (1983). The critically acclaimed film, which he also wrote, won him the Karnataka State Film Award for Best Screenplay. Then he entered Malayalam film industry with Unaroo, which was based on then prevailing trade union politics. His first Tamil film Pagal Nilavu (1985) was a commercial failure, but immediately followed Idaya Kovil (1985) found theatrical success. The following year, he made the romantic drama Mouna Ragam, which narrated the story of a young woman who is forced into an arranged marriage by her family. The critical and commercial success of the film established him as a leading filmmaker in Tamil cinema. His next release Nayakan, starring Kamal Haasan, was inspired by the life of the Bombay-based gangster Varadarajan Mudaliar. The film was submitted by India as its official entry for the 60th Academy Awards. Later in 2005, Nayakan was included in Time's "All-Time 100 Movies" list. Mani Ratnam followed this with the tragic romance Geethanjali (1989), which marked his Telugu cinema debut; the tragedy Anjali (1990), which narrated the story of an autistic child; and the crime drama Thalapathi (1991), loosely adapted from the Indian epic Mahabharata. In 1992, he made the romantic thriller Roja for Kavithalayaa Productions. The film was dubbed into many Indian languages, including Hindi, and its widespread success brought national recognition to Mani Ratnam. Three years later, he made Bombay (1995), which was based on the 1992–93 Bombay riots. Although controversial for its depiction of religious riots, the film met with wide critical acclaim and became commercially successful in India.

In 1997, Mani Ratnam co-produced and directed the political drama film Iruvar, which was loosely based on the relationship between cinema and politics in Tamil Nadu. The following year, he made his Bollywood debut with Dil Se.., the third film in his "terrorism trilogy". A box-office failure in India, the film emerged as a success overseas; it became the first Indian film to be placed among the top 10 at the United Kingdom box-office. In 2002, Mani Ratnam directed the critically acclaimed drama Kannathil Muthamittal, which was set against the backdrop of the Sri Lankan Civil War. The commercial failure was the most successful film at the 50th National Film Awards, winning six honours including the award for the Best Feature Film in Tamil. He returned to Bollywood after a six-year hiatus with the political drama Yuva (2004); the project was simultaneously filmed in Tamil as Aayutha Ezhuthu with a different cast. His next release was the biographical film Guru (2007), a drama inspired by the life of the industrialist Dhirubhai Ambani. In 2010, Mani Ratnam worked on the Tamil-Hindi bilingual Raavanan/Raavan, which was based on the Indian epic Ramayana. Three years later, he produced and directed the crime drama Kadal, a critical and box office failure. This was followed by O Kadhal Kanmani (2015), a romantic drama about a cohabiting couple. The critically acclaimed film was his first commercial success in the 2010s.

Filmography

Television

Notes

Citations

References

External links 

Director filmographies
Indian filmographies